This is a list of tribute albums dedicated to Colombian singer-songwriter Shakira. Since her debut in the 1990s, various artists have made tribute albums to the singer. Although she is mostly a Latin pop and rock artist, her tribute albums have covered a wide range of different genres and styles, including instrumental, jazz, children's music etc. The record label Big Eye Music released two albums - both titled A Tribute to Shakira - in 2002 and 2007. The first album contains all versions of Shakira's solo crossover album.

Several Latin and foreign artists and bands have recorded albums compiling various Shakira songs in both Spanish and English. Some companies like Rockabye Baby! released an album of Shakira's most famous songs covered in lullabies. Some others that released albums covering their songs are the "Santa Clara Entertainment Group" with a CD that went on sale in physical format. 

The vast majority of these recordings were made once Shakira managed to internationalize with her "Laundry Service" album, with songs like "Whenever Wherever","Underneath Your Clothes", "Eyes like Yours (Ojos Así)" and "Objection (Tango)" appearing the most. 

Some albums have been reviewed by pages like AllMusic receiving mostly mixed reviews for their interpretation of the songs, some favorable and very few with negative criticism for the unsuccessful attempt to "imitate" Shakira's style and characteristic voice.

Tribute Albums

See also 

 Shakira discography
 List of songs recorded by Shakira

References 

Shakira
Lists of tribute albums